Finström is a municipality of Åland, an autonomous territory of Finland.

The municipality is unilingually Swedish.

Godby is the second biggest built-up area in Åland after Mariehamn, inhabited by around 1300 people, or one-thirds of the municipality's population. A pharmacy, banks, a post office, a swimming hall and a health center are among the amenities that can be found in Godby.

History
Finström was widely inhabited in the Viking Age. The church of St. Michael is one of the oldest in Åland with the oldest parts dating from the 12th century. Grelsby kungsgård was the place where king Gustavus Vasa stayed with his entourage of 312 people for a few days in the spring of 1556. Swedish king Gustaf IV Adolf also stayed there for six weeks in the summer of 1808 prior to the 1809 loss of Finland to Russia. During the Finnish civil war several communists were executed outside Godby, on the ice of Färjsundet.

Geography
Finström is right in the middle of mainland Åland and is bordered by a total of five municipalities: Sund to the east, Saltvik to the northeast, Geta to the north, Hammarland to the west and Jomala to the south. The most significant main roads of Finström are Highway 2 between Mariehamn and Sund, and Highway 4 to Geta.

Långsjön, the largest lake in Åland, is located in the municipality, as is the Almskogen nature reserve. Notable bays include Kasviken and Ödkarbyviken.

Economy
Godby is by far the center of Finström's economy. The biggest employer in the municipality is Optinova, a plastic factory with 130 employees. Tourism is also an important line of business.

Agricultural products grown especially in the northern parts of Finström include apples and various vegetables, and fishing is also a source of income for some.

Images

References

External links

Municipality of Finström – Official website 

Municipalities of Åland